Clarkson Farm Complex is a historic farm and national historic district located near Greeleyville, Williamsburg County, South Carolina.  It encompasses 8 contributing buildings and 1 contributing site with buildings dating from about 1896 to 1928. They include the main house, store, smokehouse, garage, stable/garage, tenant house, pumphouse, wellhouse and pecan grove.  The main house was built about 1905, and is a two-story, frame I-house on a brick pier foundation. The Clarkson Store was built about 1896, and is representative of one of few surviving rural commercial buildings. The pecan grove was planted in 1922.

It was listed on the National Register of Historic Places in 1988.

References

Farms on the National Register of Historic Places in South Carolina
Historic districts on the National Register of Historic Places in South Carolina
Houses completed in 1905
Buildings and structures in Williamsburg County, South Carolina
National Register of Historic Places in Williamsburg County, South Carolina
Houses in Williamsburg County, South Carolina
1905 establishments in South Carolina